Criticism of Zoroastrianism has taken place over many centuries not only from the adherents of other religions but also among Zoroastrians themselves seeking to reform the faith.

Zoroaster
In the early 19th century, a Christian missionary based in British India, John Wilson, claimed that Zoroaster never had a genuine divine commission (or ever claimed such a role), never performed miracles, or uttered prophecies and that the story of his life is "a mere tissue of comparatively modern fables and fiction." Others assert that all the available Zoroastrian sources regarding Zoroaster only provide conflicting images about him, especially between earlier and later sources.

Literature
The Dasatir-i-Asmani, while being accepted by Zoroastrian communities in Iran and India as genuine, especially by the Kadmi, it is generally believed to be a forgery.

Wilson argued that the Avesta could not be divinely inspired because much of its text was irrevocably lost or unintelligible and Martin Haug, who greatly helped the Parsis of India to defend their religion against the attacks of such Christian missionaries as Wilson, considered the Gathas to be the only texts and only authoritative scriptures that could be attributed to Zoroaster.

Polytheism
John Wilson attacked the Zoroastrian reverence of the Amesha Spenta and Yazatas as a form of polytheism, although the Parsis at the time immediately refuted this allegation and insisted that he had in fact addressed the Bundahishn, a text whose relevance to their practice was remote. Critics also commonly claim that Zoroastrians are worshipers of other deities and elements of nature, such as of fire—with one prayer, the Litany to the fire (Atesh Niyaesh), stating: "I invite, I perform (the worship) of you, the Fire, O son of Ahura Mazdā together with all fires"—and Mithra. Some critics have charged Zoroastrians with being followers of dualism, who only claimed to be followers of monotheism in modern times to confront the powerful influence of Christian and Western thought which "hailed monotheism as the highest category of theology." Critics insist that the monotheistic reformist view is seen to contradict the conservative (or traditional) view of a dualistic worldview most evident in the relationship between Ahura Mazda and Angra Mainyu. and arguing that Zoroastrians follow a belief system influenced by henotheism. Other Western scholars such as Martin Haug, however, have dismissed the concept of theological dualism as a corruption of Zoroaster's original teachings, gradually added by later adherents of the faith. Critics add that the fact that such differing views have proliferated are a sign of the enigmatic nature of the Zoroastrian beliefs regarding the divinity.

Inter-Zoroastrian divisions
Zoroastrian reformers, such as Maneckji Nusserwanji Dhalla, have argued that literary precedence should be given to the Gathas, as a source of authority and textual authenticity. They have also deplored and criticized many Zoroastrian rituals (e.g. excessive ceremonialism and focus on purity, using "bull's urine for ritual cleansing, the attendance of a dog to gaze at the corpse during funerary rites, the exposure of corpses on towers [for consumption by vultures and ravens]") and theological and cosmological doctrines as not befitting of the faith. This orthodox versus reformist controversy rages even on the internet.

Divisions and tensions also exist between Iranian and Indian Zoroastrians and over such issues as the authority of a hereditary priesthood in the transmission and interpretation of the faith, ethnicity and the nature of Ahura Mazda. Historically, differences also existed between the Zoroastrian branches of Zurvanism, Mazdakism and Mazdaism.

Who is a Zoroastrian (Zarathushti)?
Much like the question of who is a Jew?, Zoroastrian identity, especially whether it is adopted through birth or belief (or both), "remains a cause for tension" within the community. Reformers have criticised the orthodox refusal to accept religious converts as one reason for the communities' declining population.

Predestination
Zoroastrians have been criticized by Muslim authors for their rejection of predestination. This follows a famous hadith of Muhammad in which he negatively associates the Qadariyah Islamic sect with the Magians.

Patriarchy
Zoroastrianism has been criticized for the perception that it promotes a patriarchal system, expressed through such avenues as an all-male priesthood and its historical allowance of polygamy—practiced by Zoroaster himself.

References

Zoroastrianism
Zoroastrianism